The Symphony No. 5, Op. 38, is a four-movement orchestral composition written from 1963 to 1964 by the Swedish composer Dag Wirén. Despite its numbering, the Fifth Symphony represents Wirén's fourth, and final, contribution to the form as a professional (the composer withdrew the Symphony No. 1, Op. 3—a 1932 experimental "study work" from his student years in Paris—and prohibited its performance), arriving twelve years after its predecessor, the Symphony No. 4. Swedish conductor Sixten Ehrling premiered the new symphony with the Swedish Radio Symphony Orchestra in Stockholm on 5 December 1964.

Structure 
The Fifth Symphony is in four movements. They are as follows:

Orchestration 
Woodwind: 2 flutes, 2 oboes, 2 clarinets, 2 bassoons
Brass: 4 horns, 3 trumpets, 3 trombones, tuba
Percussion: timpani
Strings: violins, violas, cellos, double basses

Recordings 
To date, there is one commercial recording of the Fifth Symphony, which cpo released in 1998:

The Dausgaard recording has received generally positive reviews. ClassicsToday.com's David Hurwitz, for example, praises the Fifth Symphony (and its disc partner, the Symphony No. 4) as "truly memorable" works by "a grossly underrated composer", in particular applauding Wirén for his "exceptional ingenuity" in variation technique and for his "staggeringly efficient and colorful orchestration". Hurwitz concludes: "These symphonies are magnificent mosaics so beautifully sculpted and so easy to follow that they truly deserve the widest dissemination among music lovers". Fanfare's Paul Snook, describing the Fifth as a "somewhat darker and slightly more expansive work" than the Fourth, labels the disc "an excellent introduction" to Wirén and his "severely enigmatic late style". The American Record Guide's David Raymond, in contrast to Hurwitz and Snook, dismisses the Symphonies Nos. 4 and 5 as "strange music curiously lacking in character and exud[ing] little emotional warmth or individuality".

References

Sources 

CD liner notes

Websites

Music criticism
 
 
 

Symphonies by Dag Wirén
20th-century classical music
Classical music in Sweden
1964 compositions